Oscar E. Carlstrom (July 16, 1878 – March 6, 1948) was an American lawyer.

Biography
Carlstrom was born on a farm near Aledo, Illinois and graduated from New Boston High School. He attended a law course at Northern Illinois College of Law in Dixon, Illinois. As a member of the United States Volunteers, he joined the 39th Volunteer Infantry from August 26, 1899 to May 6th, 1901 and was stationed in the Philippines for 16 months. He also served in Illinois Army National Guard with the 6th Illinois Infantry and the 123rd Field Artillery Regiment from November 26, 1916 to June 7, 1919 during World War I and was stationed in France for one year. He became a captain.

Carlstrom was admitted to the Illinois Bar in 1903. He served as Aledo City Attorney and as state's attorney for Mercer County, Illinois. Carlstrom served as a delegate to the Illinois Constitutional Convention of 1920 and was a member of the Illinois State Tax Commission from 1921 to 1925. Carlstrom was a Republican. From 1925 to 1933, Carlstrom served as Illinois Attorney General. 

In 1936, he ran unsuccessfully for the Republican nomination for governor.

Carlstrom died at his home in Aledo, Illinois.

References

1878 births
1948 deaths
People from Aledo, Illinois
Illinois Republicans
Illinois Attorneys General
Illinois National Guard personnel
National Guard (United States) officers
United States Army personnel of World War I